The K'gari (Fraser Island) Great Walk is a long-distance walking track on K'gari, Queensland, Australia. Hikers should be fully self-sufficient and to carry sufficient water. The walk is rated easy to moderate on a difficulty scale being mostly at sea level and is traversed in one direction.

It leads from Dilli Village, an environmental education camp of the University of the Sunshine Coast, to Happy Valley. The entire 90 km walk, which includes numerous smaller walks branching off the main trail, can be completed in 6 to 8 days. The Queensland Parks and Wildlife Service (QPWS) provides 8 walkers' camps for which a booking is essential.

The landscape during the walk changes between coastal heathland, mangrove forest, woodland and subtropical rainforest. The crystal-clear lakes and sand dunes are the highlights of this track. Due to the rain season, it is better not to do this hike from January to March.

See also

 List of long-distance hiking tracks in Australia

References

External links
 Fraser Island Great Walk – Department of National Parks, Recreation, Sport and Racing
 Great Walks of Queensland – Department of National Parks, Recreation, Sport and Racing
 Private Travelogue – Very detailed report from a couple that hiked the track with many pictures
 The Fraser Island Defenders Organisation and the National Parks Association of Queensland are extending the great walk in memory of late member, George Haddock. The George Haddock Trail is a work under construction

Hiking and bushwalking tracks in Queensland
Tourist attractions in Queensland
Fraser Island